Baidu Yi (易 Yì meaning "exchange" or "easy"), also known as "Baidu Yun", was an operating system for mobile devices until Baidu suspended it.  It is based on Google's Android but is a fork by Baidu, the dominant search engine operator in China.  It was announced on 2 September 2011 at the 2011 Baidu Technology Innovation Conference in Beijing.

Background 
On “2011 Baidu Technology Innovation Conference”, Baidu launched its first mobile terminal software platform, Baidu Yi.  It has integrated Baidu's intelligent search, cloud service, and various Baidu apps. Through collaboration with terminal manufactures, operators, mobile Internet service providers, and other upstream and downstream industry chains, it provides the users with convenient, abundant, and personalized mobile Internet experience. Baidu-Yi was developed especially for domestic Chinese smartphones, built on top of Android but replacing much of the original Google software with the network's own alternatives. There's Ting music, Baidu Maps instead of Google Maps, the Baidu Yue e-reader, and Google Search has been stripped out and replaced with Baidu Search. In March 2015 Baidu officially stated that Baidu Yun is suspended

Features 
It will have Baidu applications, replacing Google's for many core functions, such as the search engine, instant messenger, ebook reader, and app store.  Baidu is expected to provide 180 gigabytes of cloud storage for users.

Functions

SmartBox Search 
 Quick Search: Enable searching several seconds after booting to direct users to the targeted content within short time.
 Voice Search: Enable searching while speaking.
 Move Search: Enable searching while reading the content.
 Smart Semantic Analysis: Accurately identify users' needs.
 Local+Cloud Data: Precisely show search results.

Cloud Services 
 Initially 180GB Storage: Can be upgraded to unlimited storage space.
 Support Local Data Sync and Backup: Support Local documents, pictures, music, and videos synchronization and contacts and program schedule backing up.

Local Functions 
 Smart Dialing(): Dials allow indexing by name or phone number.
 Caller Address Display(): Works on all incoming and outgoing calls.
 Data Monitoring(): Exact to each program's data analysis and data limit warning.
 Anti Telephone Harassment(): Prevent users from telephone harassments.
 Blessing SMS(): All kinds of blessing SMS for different festivals and vacation allowing users to choose from.
 Anti Charging Malpractice(): Help identify and remind of charging malpractice.
 Unified Account(): Only log in once.
 Yi Store(): A variety of apps meeting users needs of entertainment, studying, working, and daily life.

Baidu Apps 
 Ting Music() 
 Maps() 
 Yue ereader(阅 Yue meaning "read") 
 What's Near()

Devices 
On 6 September 2011, it was reported that Dell was developing new phones that are planned to operate Yi for sale in the Chinese market; Baidu also said that it was working with other unnamed companies, including hardware manufacturers, to support the Yi platform.

On 20 December 2011, Dell announced their first Baidu Yi phone model: the Dell Streak 101DL.  It is a touchscreen smartphone for the Chinese market that runs the Baidu-Yi platform on Android system  and is available on China's Unicom network.

See also 
OPhone by China Mobile

References

External links 
 Official site

Baidu
2011 software
Smartphones
Embedded Linux
Mobile Linux
Cloud clients
Mobile operating systems
Android (operating system)